Rehab is an American Southern hip hop group from Warner Robins, Georgia. The band has recorded seven albums, including two each for Epic Records, Universal Republic and Average Joes Entertainment. Currently the band is Independent with distribution from ONErpm.  They are mainly known for their 2008 hit, "Bartender Song (Sittin' at a Bar)".

History

1998–1999: Formation and debut
Rehab was originally formed as a trio: Denny Campbell (Steaknife), Danny (Boone) Alexander, and Jason Brooks (Brooks Buford). Danny Boone and Steaknife, both from Warner Robins, Georgia, were the rap group "Prime Suspect". Danny Boone and Brooks Buford were both recovering alcoholics and drug addicts. It is a common misconception that they met at a rehab facility. The trio formed Rehab, literally a product of their namesake. Early on, they released their first album To Whom It May Consume produced by Steaknife and Brooks Buford.

2000–2002: Departure of Steaknife, and Southern Discomfort
Soon after To Whom It May Consume, Steaknife was incarcerated and Epic/Sony offered a record deal. The group decided to continue on as a duo. Mashing rap with rock, the duo released their major label debut album, Southern Discomfort, in 2000 on the Sony label. Cee-Lo & Bigg Gipp of Goodie Mob, Mandy Lauderdale and Cody ChesnuTT were the guests on the album, which would spawn the Top 15 modern rock hit "It Don't Matter" and "Sittin' At A Bar." Two years were spent on the road supporting the album touring with Kottonmouth Kings and the Phunk Junkeez, including a stint on the Warped Tour.

2002–2004: Cuz We Can, departure of Buford, and hiatus
Around 2002, Buford released 26 unreleased Rehab songs on his website. This was later known to fans as Cuz We Can.  22 of the 26 songs were produced by Denny "Steaknife" Campbell. It was later pressed and given out to on tours by Boone in 2007, and was made available on their store. Boone also modified the track list of the pressed version, removing certain songs and adding new ones.

After two years on the road supporting the Vans Warped Tour and playing with bands such as Linkin Park, Danny left the group over a difference in creative view points. It was rumoured that Brooks had a drug addiction while touring. After they finished, the duo split and went on an indefinite hiatus.

2004–2010: Reformation, Graffiti the World, and Welcome Home

In 2004, Boone connected with Atlanta producer Shannon Houchins who began to work on new music. Houchins also put together a new band consisting of former Rehab guitarist Mike Hartnett, and three of Houchins' session players, Hano Leathers, Chris Hood and Foz. Boone retained the name while Houchins began to book a tour and take on temporary management duties. Now a quintet with Boone as the lone singer/rapper – and also using his birth name, Danny Alexander. Soon after Houchins' added rapper Demun Jones to the band.

In 2005, Rehab signed with Arshid Entertainment and released the ambitious Graffiti the World.

Sometime in 2008, the three original members decided to do a reunion EP and go by the name Southern Discomfort in which the EP would be self-titled. Their label saw this and decided to halt most of the promotion for this since the name of Southern Discomfort was essentially owned by Epic/Sony. In result, the label released Sitting at a Bar which was a re-release of their debut album and also an out-lash towards the band. All of this was done without the band's permission. To fight this unauthorized reissue the band re-recorded its now famous drinking song and renamed it "Bartender Song." This version would end up on a 2008 version of Graffiti the World released by the major label Universal. Rehab stuck with Universal for their 2010 album Welcome Home. Which gained the band more commercial success and a "whole different" new fanbase due to the success of a few singles that ran for top 30 video countdown on CMT until January 2011.

2011–2014: Gullible's Travels and breakup
Their Follow-up titled Gullible's Travels was released on February 21, 2012 through AVJ Records (a subsidiary label of Average Joe's Entertainment) owned by former Rehab producer and manager Shannon Houchins and country music artist Colt Ford, and they started the tour of the same name on Friday January 13, 2012 to promote the new album. The Single "Waho by the Hoti" (the Waffle House by the hotel) is available now on iTunes. The video for their single "King of Tweakers", which was released on their website in the summer of 2011, premiered on February 21, 2012 with the album release. 
A video for the next single "Can't Catch Up To You" was recorded. On July 3, 2013, a track by Twiztid was released off their first mixtape A New Nightmare entitled "Unjust love", featuring Danny Boone. The band released a single also in 2013 entitled "Whore" which would be the last recorded content by the band.

In 2014, the band released a statement to their fans that they would be going on a farewell tour and then disband to form solo careers. Before the break the band had recorded a full album titled Million Dollar Mugshot of which Average Joes Entertainment eventually released in 2017.

2015–2016: Possible reformation
Sometime in June 2015, former founding member, Denny Campbell (Steaknife) posted on his Facebook page that said there was a possible Rehab reunion between Danny Boone and himself. He continued to post pictures of him and Boone in the studio as well. On March 19, 2016, a possible album cover was posted on Rehab's website. On September 1, 2017, they released an album titled Million Dollar Mug Shot, which is a collection of songs that were previously recorded by the most recent iteration of Rehab but never released for various reasons. That being said there was no tour to promote this album, as they were still on hiatus at this point.

2017–present: Reformation
On December 31, 2017, Danny Boone announced via a video on the official Rehab Facebook page that Rehab had returned. In the video he stated there would be new music and tour in 2018 from Rehab. He also stated that the band lineup is now Danny Boone and Jericho, in addition to a full band again.

On April 12, 2019, the studio album titled Galaga was released. This is the first album released independently with the help of ONErpm. Full tours in 2019 and 2020 followed as well. The tour included a band but with a different lineup as prior iteration as seen below. The new band line up includes local artist from Warner Robins. The band was originally in their own group called Some Kids, as they were gaining steam locally they were forced to go on hiatus. Danny and Jericho approached some of the members of Some Kids about being in Rehab and they agreed. The current line up is Dj Uh-Oh aka Austin Sanderson, Brandon Dover on bass Caleb Melvin on drums, and Taylor Robbins on guitar. It has been speculated Danny is working on new material while also being on tour, for another Rehab album as well as another possible solo hip hop album in the near future. Speculation also includes Danny working on the production side of things possibly trying to build a local production team to handle all future projects as well as help local artist from Warner Robins and all of GA.

Band members

Final lineup
Danny "Boone" Alexander (vocals)

Former members
Jason Brooks 'Buford' (vocals)
Denny Campbell (Steaknife) (vocals)
Lamar Williams Jr. (vocals)
Hano Leathers (bass)
Fazal "Foz" Syed (guitar) 
Mike Hartnett (guitar)
Demun Jones (vocals)
DJ Chris Crisis (DJ)
Chris Hood (drums)
Doyle Williams (guitar)
Jay "Jericho" Robinson (vocals)
Austin “Dj Uh-Oh” Sanderson (Dj)
Brandon Dover (Bass)
Caleb Melvin (Drummer)
Taylor Robins (guitar)

Timeline

Discography

Albums

Studio albums

Live albums

Mix albums

Singles

Music videos

References

External links
Rehabmusic.com – official website
Rehab Lyrics

Musical groups established in 1998
Musical groups from Georgia (U.S. state)
Southern hip hop groups
Rap rock groups